The National Assessment Agency (NAA) was, until December 2008, a subsidiary unit of the Qualifications and Curriculum Authority (QCA), an executive non-departmental public body (NDPB) of the Department for Education and Skills (now the Department for Education) in England and Wales. The agency was based on Bolton Street in west London.

History
First announced in November 2003, the agency was not officially launched until April 2004. The agency took over the delivery and administration of the National Curriculum Tests in England, previously undertaken by the QCA to whom they are accountable.

Functions
As well as being responsible for the national curriculum tests, the agency worked work with examination bodies in further reforms of the GCSE and A-level examinations in England and Wales.

Examination reforms
The agency claimed that it would modernise the examination system, for which it was given a remit from the government of £100m. The remit covered a two-year period from 2004 to 2006. The NAA's Managing Director was David Gee. He was forced to leave on 16 December 2008.

Administration of tests
Whilst the NAA took over the administrative task of test delivery, QCA retained their role in regulating testing standards. Prior to the launch of the NAA, Charles Clarke, the then Secretary of State for Education and Skills stated that the separation of these two roles, made possible by the creation of the new agency, would decrease what was regarded by the government as conflicting responsibilities.

External links
 Official site
 Ministerial statement by Charles Clarke explaining the role of the NAA, November 2003.
 Press release by QCA announcing the launch of the NAA, April 2004.

News items
 End of the NAA in December 2008 - Telegraph

Education in England
Defunct public bodies of the United Kingdom
Organizations established in 2004
Standardised tests in England
Government agencies disestablished in 2008
2004 establishments in England
Standardised tests in Wales
2008 disestablishments in England